is the name for an archaeological site with the remnant of a late Jōmon period settlement located in the Ushinuma neighborhood of the city of Akiruno, Tokyo in the Kantō region of Japan. It received protection as a National Historic Site in 1933.

Overview
The Nishiakiru site is located on a river terrace on the bank of the Akikawa River. Per an archaeological excavation conducted in 1932, the remains of five pit dwellings with flagstone floors, two tombs with clay sarcophagus, and one stone-framed hearth were discovered, and were dated to the late Jōmon period. One side of the floor had an overhang to serve as a doorway.  At the time of its discovery, such buildings had only been known to exist in the western and central mountainous areas of the Kantō region from the middle Jōmon period (about 3500 years ago), and this discovery proved that such buildings also existed in the flatlands.  

The site has been backfilled after excavation, and there is nothing at the location but an explanatory placard. It is a five minute walk from the "Ushinuma" bus stop on the Nishi Tokyo Bus from Akigawa Station on the JR East Itsukaichi Line.

See also

List of Historic Sites of Japan (Tōkyō)

References

External links
 Akiruno City home page 
 Tokyo Cultural Properties Database 

Jōmon period
History of Tokyo
Akiruno, Tokyo
Historic Sites of Japan